The Târgul is a right tributary of the river Șomuzul Mare in Romania. It crosses the city of Fălticeni.

References

Rivers of Romania
Rivers of Suceava County